Angeot "Ange" Dellasantina (4 November 1933, in Ajaccio – 26 July 2014, in Ajaccio) was a French footballer who played as a defender.

Biography 
Dellasantina debuted as professionally in 1954 with AC Arles-Avignon after doing military service in Avignon. A year later he signed with SC Bastia, and after one season transferred to Gazélec Ajaccio, with whom he remained until 1968, the year of his retirement. During his stay at the club went on to win the Championnat National four times.

References 

1933 births
2014 deaths
Sportspeople from Ajaccio
French footballers
AC Arlésien players
Gazélec Ajaccio players
SC Bastia players

Association football defenders
Footballers from Corsica